Jacobo Penzo (born 1948 in Carora), is a Venezuelan filmmaker, best known for his drama piece The House of Water, shown in the  
Directors' Fortnight section of the Cannes Film Festival in 1984. The film also represented Venezuela in the Best Foreign Language Film competition at the 57th Academy Awards. Penzo is also a painter and a writer.

Biography
Jacobo Penzo was born in Carora Lara, Venezuela on September 22, 1948. He moved to Caracas with his family in 1957. After high school he studied journalism at the Central University of Venezuela. From 1999 to 2002 Penzo was President of the Venezuelan National Cinematheque Foundation (Cinemateca Nacional)

Awards

Venezuelan National Cinema Award (Premio Nacional de Cine de Venezuela) in 2002.
Ordre des Arts et des Lettres by the Government of France in 2007 in recognition to Penzo´s artistic talents

Films

The House of Water ("La Casa de Agua"), 1984
Música Nocturna  ("Night Music"), 1987
En territorio Extranjero ("On A Foreign Land") 1993
Borrador ( "Draft" ) co-production,           2006
Cabimas donde todo comenzó ("Cabimas, the burst") 2012

Documentaries

Some of Penzo´s documentaries are:

Falso Retrato de Luis Alberto Crespo (" Fake Portrait of LAC ")  2014
El Profeta Olvidado ( "The Forgotten Prophet" ), co-production with Carlos Azpúrua 2003
Maracaibo Blues 2001
Algunas Preguntas a la Mujeres (Questions to Women) 1984
El Silencio de la Memoria ("The Silence of the Past") 1986
La Pastora Resiste  ("The Old Town Battle")   1982
El Afinque de Marín ("The Barrio Beat") 1980
Tecnología para el hombre ("Progress for The People") 1986
El Compadre Antonio ("Saint Anthony: a Friend of the People") 1982
Dos Ciudades ("Two Cities") 1982

Writings

Veinte años por un Cine de Author, essay, 2000
Que Habrá sido de Herbert Marcuse, short stories, 2014 
Rumores, poems, 2015

References

1948 births
Living people
Venezuelan cinematographers
Venezuelan film directors